Zygmunt Andrzej Heinrich (21 July 1937 in Łbowo, central Poland – 27 May 1989 in Mount Everest)  was a Polish mountaineer. He died in an avalanche on the northwest slopes of Mount Everest in 1989.

Achievements

Tatra Mts and Alps 
Zygmunt Andrzej Heinrich undertook many serious climbs including difficult new routes and first winter ascents. Among Polish climbers the team Heinrich-Chrobak was held in high prestige and Eugeniusz Chrobak is still considered one of the best Polish Himalayan climbers of all time. The Heinrich-Chrobak team was very much the Polish equivalent of the Bonington-Whillans team in Britain.

Great Ranges 
1971 – Kunyang Chhish (7852 m) – first ascent to the summit (along with Andrzej Zawada, Jan Stryczyński and Ryszard Szafirski).
1974 – Lhotse (8250 m) in winter with Andrzej Zawada, the first time anyone had gone above 8000 m in winter.
1978 – Kanchenjunga Central (8482 m), first ascent – together with Wojciech Brański, Kazimierz Olech.
1979 – Lhotse (8516 m), 4 October, ascent together with Andrzej Czok, Jerzy Kukuczka and Janusz Skorek.
1980 – Mount Everest, participation in the winter expedition, leading the way by the Ice Fall, participated in setting up higher camps.
1981 – Masherbrum, SW Peak (7806 m), first ascent, with Marek Malatyński and Przemysław Nowacki.
1985 – Cho Oyu (8201 m), winter expedition, new route via SE Pillar, ascent with Jerzy Kukuczka (15 February, three days after the first winter ascent by the team of the same expedition, Maciej Berbeka and Maciej Pawlikowski).
1985 – Nanga Parbat (8126 m), first ascent of the NE buttress, on summit together with Jerzy Kukuczka, Carlos Carsolio and Sławomir Łobodziński.

Sources 
 Józef Nyka: Masherbrum Southwest, Ascent and Tragedy. American Alpine Journal, 1982, pp. 271–272
 Andrzej Zawada: "Winter at 8250 m:  Polish Expedition to Lhotse 1974", Alpine Journal, 1974, pp. 28–35.
 Andrzej Zawada: Cho Oyu's Three-Kilometer-High Face. American Alpine Journal, 1986, pp. 6–13 (with 2 photographs with lines depicted)
 AAJ 1986, p. 290 (note on Nanga Parbat)

External links
 AAJ, Searchable online access
  Strona poświęcona pamięci himalaisty Andrzeja Heinricha  (in Polish)
 portrait on www.nyka.home.pl (in Polish)

Polish mountain climbers
Mountaineering deaths on Mount Everest
1937 births
1989 deaths
Deaths in avalanches
People from Płońsk County
Sportspeople from Masovian Voivodeship
Natural disaster deaths in Nepal